Jason Lawrence Simmons (born March 30, 1976) is a former American football strong safety and current defensive passing game coordinator and secondary coach for the Las Vegas Raiders of the National Football League (NFL). He was drafted by the Pittsburgh Steelers in the fifth round of the 1998 NFL Draft. He played college football at Arizona State.

College career
He was a 4-year letterman for Arizona State University, earning second-team All-Pacific-10 honors as a senior.

Coaching career

Green Bay
Simmons began his coaching career as an assistant special teams coach for Green Bay from 2011–2017, where he helped the Packers special teams units excel across the board. In that stretch, the Packers ranked second in the league in opponent punt return average (5.7), and they were second in the league in yards per punt return (10.7) in 2017.

In 2018, Simmons served as the Packers' secondary coach, helping the team finish 12th in the NFL in pass defense (234.5 ypg) – a significant improvement after Green Bay finished 23rd in the category in 2017. Under Simmons' watch, Alexander led the team with 11 passes defensed and finished second in tackles (64) in just 13 games, earning him a spot on the PFWA's All-Rookie team.

He spent 2019 as Green Bay's defensive backs coach, where he helped the team advance to the NFC Championship game and finish the regular season tied for third in the league in interceptions, third in completion percentage allowed, fourth in pass breakups, fifth in forced fumbles, tied for fifth in passing touchdowns allowed and sixth in defensive passer rating. Cornerback Kevin King totaled five interceptions on the year (t-4th) with 15 passes defensed (t-8th). Cornerback Jaire Alexander added two interceptions and finished tied for fourth in the league in passes defensed with 17.

Carolina
Simmons joined the Panthers in 2020 where he helped a young Panthers defense improve to 18th in the NFL in points allowed per game after the team finished 31st in the category in 2019. Under Simmons' tutelage, five different veterans in the secondary posted individual statistical career highs. In Week 11 vs. Detroit, the Panthers recorded their seventh shutout in franchise history (20–0), while holding Lions' quarterback Matthew Stafford to a season-low 178 passing yards and 70.0 passer rating. In Week 15, the Panthers defense held Packers MVP quarterback Aaron Rodgers to a season-low 143 passing yards.

In 2021, Simmons helped lead the Carolina Panthers to the 2nd ranked defense in the NFL in total yards allowed, and 4th in passing yards allowed per game.

Charity work
In 2007, the Texans signed Green Bay Packers running back Ahman Green to a four-year contract. Green had worn the uniform number 30 throughout his career, but on the Texans, that number had been assigned to Simmons since 2002. Green offered to purchase the right to use the number from Simmons, but Simmons instead devised a plan where he would give Green the number in exchange for his help in purchasing a home for a needy family. Green contributed $25,000 to the cause, Simmons added $5,000 of his own, and Texans owner Bob McNair chipped in a further $25,000. After soliciting applications, the players selected Regina Foster, a 37-year-old single mother whose seven-year-old son Reggie was afflicted with autism. With their help, Foster purchased a $100,000 home near Reggie's school, and area businesses made additional contributions, such as groceries, furniture, electricity, and phone and internet service.

References

Jason Simmons Carolina Panthers coaching profile

1976 births
Living people
Sportspeople from Los Angeles County, California
American football safeties
Arizona State Sun Devils football players
Pittsburgh Steelers players
Houston Texans players
Players of American football from California
Carolina Panthers coaches
Green Bay Packers coaches
Las Vegas Raiders coaches